Statistics of Czechoslovak First League in the 1928–29 season. Antonín Puč was the league's top scorer with 13 goals.

Overview
It was contested by 7 teams, and Slavia Prague won the championship.

League standings

Results

Top goalscorers

References

Czechoslovakia - List of final tables (RSSSF)

Czechoslovak First League seasons
1928–29 in Czechoslovak football
Czech